Skam España (often stylised as SKAM España) is a Spanish teen drama television series based on the Norwegian television series Skam. Its four seasons originally aired from September 2018 to October 2020 on Movistar+.

Premise 

Cast 
 Alba Planas as Eva Vázquez Villanueva (central character in season 1).
  as Cris Soto (central character in season 2).
  as Nora (central character in season 3).
  as Amira Naybet (central character in season 4).
  as Viri (central character in season 3).
 Alejandro Reina as Lucas.
  as Joana.
  as Miquel.
 Lucas Nabor as Dani Soto.

Production and release 
Skam España consists of an adaptation of the Norwegian series Skam. The series premiered on 16 September 2018. Shooting of the series took place in Madrid. Season 2 premiered on 1 April 2019. The broadcasting run ended on 24 October 2020, after 4 seasons and 39 episodes, which feature an approximate running time of 35 minutes.

References 

2018 Spanish television series debuts
2020 Spanish television series endings
2010s Spanish drama television series
2020s Spanish drama television series
Spanish teen drama television series
Movistar+ network series
Television shows set in Madrid
Television shows filmed in Spain
Spanish LGBT-related television shows
Spanish television series based on non-Spanish television series
2010s teen drama television series
2020s teen drama television series
Television series about teenagers